Wanakuni (Aymara wanaku, wanaqu, -ni a suffix to indicate ownership, "the one with the guanaco", Hispanicized spelling Huanacuni) is a  mountain in the Cordillera Real in the Bolivian Andes. It is situated in the La Paz Department, Sud Yungas Province, Yanacachi Municipality, northeast of the city of La Paz. Wanakuni lies at a lake named Warawarani, southeast of Sura Qullu.

References 

Mountains of La Paz Department (Bolivia)